Redemption is the thirteenth studio album by American blues rock guitarist Joe Bonamassa. It was released on September 21, 2018 through Provogue / Mascot Music Productions.

Reception
Redemption holds a Metacritic score of 69 out of 100 based on 4 critics, indicating generally favorable reviews.

The album ranked No. 26 on the US Billboard 200, No. 2 on Top Rock Albums, and No. 1 on the Blues Albums chart.

The album has also been released with extended artwork in a 56 page hardcover digibook.

Track listing

Personnel

Musicians
 Joe Bonamassa – guitar, vocals
 Reese Wynans – organ, piano
 Anton Fig – drums, percussion
 Michael Rhodes – bass guitar
 Lee Thornburg – horn 
 Paulie Cerra – horn
 Kenny Grinberg – guitar
 Doug Lancio – guitar
 Gary Pinto – harmony vocals
 Mahalia Barnes – background vocals
 Jade MacRae – background vocals
 Juanita Tippins – background vocals
 Jamey Johnson – background vocals

Charts

Certifications

References

2018 albums
Joe Bonamassa albums